The National Democratic Party (NDP) is a Ghanaian political party, founded in October 2012 as a split from the ruling National Democratic Congress. Its first leader was former NDC politician Nana Konadu Agyeman Rawlings, who is also the wife of former President of Ghana and NDC founder Jerry Rawlings.

Founding
The NDP was founded in the wake of the death of President John Atta Mills in July 2012. Nana Konadu Agyeman Rawlings had been a 2011 rival of Atta Mills prior to his re-nomination as the NDC candidate for president. The NDP announced its formation as part of the opposition to the NDC's candidate, President John Dramani Mahama, for the 7 December 2012 presidential election. The NDP was announced on 6 July 2012 by its interim General Secretary, Manboah Rockson, and was said to be born of dissatisfaction with the NDC, which had often been personified by the Rawlingses and their supporters. Former populist military head of state Jerry Rawlings had formed the NDC in 1992, and had led the party as President of Ghana from 1993 to 2001, although he had differences with his successor Atta Mills. Its emblems are described as:
...a flying dove holding on to the Gye Nyame symbol as its logo and the colours red, green, white and black similar to that of the NDC with the motto: Justice, unity, peace and progress.

The NDP held its first national congress at Baba Yara Stadium Kumasi on 13 October 2012, endorsing Agyeman Rawlings as its leader. Former President Jerry Rawlings, who spoke at the NDP congress, had as a NDC member attended the launch of Mahama's campaign manifesto on 4 October, leading to what the BBC called "speculation that her candidature could divide the Rawlings home." At the NDP congress he gave a speech saying his former party had lost the "moral high ground" and promising a "proper revolution" within the NDC, saying the party's selection process had been corrupt.

Interim General Secretary Manboah Rockson resigned from the NDP just before the founding congress, saying he was returning to the NDC. Hanford Amoako, former MP for Nkoranza, was named interim General Secretary to replace him. The 13 October congress named Josiah Aryeh as National Chairman of the NDP. Other officers included Hilarius Abiwu and David Sunu.

Election performance

Parliamentary elections

Presidential elections

References

External links
Official website

2012 establishments in Ghana
Political parties established in 2012
Political parties in Ghana